CrossBones is a 2005 American horror film about the curse of a deadly pirate being unleashed upon reality television contestants. The film is directed by Daniel Zirilli who also co-wrote and co-produced it.

Plot summary
A group of people decide to be a part of a reality television show based around a treasure hunt on an island. Whichever contestant is lucky wins the ultimate prize. Unbeknownst to the contestants, an ancient curse from the ghostly pirate  Blackbeard exists on the island. They unwittingly unleash the curse which results in a bloodbath.

Partial cast
 Joseph Marino as Blackbeard  
 Mayra Soto as Serena  
 Hardy-Ames Hill as Tony  
 Jessie Camacho as Audra  
 Joe Jones as Martin  
 J. Shin as Greedy G.  
 Merlynne Williams as Melissa  
 Kevin Hawke as Scott  
 Kristin Ellich as Tris  
 John Sanzari as Gus

Release
The DVD was released in Full Frame format with Dolby Digital 5.1 Surround and Dolby Digital 2.0 Surround audio formats for English viewing. There are English and Spanish subtitles. The special features are a photo gallery, a behind the scenes documentary, trailers for other Lion's Gate releases, and a commentary track.

Reception
Mitchell Hattaway of DVD Verdict wrote a negative review that concluded with "Bottom line: Cross Bones blows." Jon Condit of Dread Central said that the film seems to be a mix of the worst pirate films ever made, but stated that "one must admire the filmmaker's faith and exuberance in his project". J. Read of Monsters At Play said that the film started out well enough, but turned into a clichéd film.

References

External links
 
 

2005 films
2005 horror films
American supernatural horror films
American ghost films
2000s supernatural horror films
Pirate films
2000s English-language films
Films directed by Daniel Zirilli
2000s American films